Moral Hygiene is the fifteenth studio album by American industrial metal band Ministry, released on October 1, 2021. In production for about three years, following the release of AmeriKKKant (2018), this album marks the band's first collaboration with bassist Paul D'Amour (previously known as the bassist of Tool), who joined Ministry in 2019, and the first to include a cover song since Relapse (2012). Moral Hygiene also includes guest appearances from guitarist Billy Morrison, former Megadeth bassist David Ellefson, former N.W.A member Arabian Prince and Ministry frontman Al Jourgensen's former bandmate in Lard, Jello Biafra. It also marks the first album since Rio Grande Blood (2006) to not feature guitarist Sin Quirin, who quit the band in March 2021 following the previous year's allegations of underage sexual relations.

Critical reception
Wall of Sound scored the album 7/10, writing that "the music is as abrasive and confrontational as ever".

Accolades

Track listing
All tracks written by Al Jourgensen except where noted:

Personnel

Ministry
Al Jourgensen – lead vocals (all except 3), backing vocals, guitars (1, 2, 3, 8, 9), bass (1, 8, 9), samples, keyboards (2, 3, 5, 7, 8), harmonica (2), organ (4), acoustic guitar (6), congas (7)
Cesar Soto – guitars (all except 5), bass (3, 7, 10)
Roy Mayorga – drums (1)
Paul D'Amour – bass (2)
John Bechdel – keyboards (8)

Additional personnel
Michael Rozon – drum programming (all except 1), backing vocals
Liz Walton – samples, backing vocals
Arabian Prince – scratching (1)
Jello Biafra – lead vocals (3)
Billy Morrison – guitars (4-6)
 David Ellefson – bass (5-6)

Production
Al Jourgensen – production
Michael Rozon – engineering
Dave Donnelly – mastering
Billy Morrison – front/back cover
Ban Garcia – layout design
Liz Walton – burning car photo
Steve Davis – management
Scott Sokol/ Pinnacle – booking
Selena Fragassi – publicist

Charts

References

2021 albums
Ministry (band) albums
Nuclear Blast albums